The following is an incomplete list of traditional dances in Albanian culture, because each region has its own dances:

Traditional Albanian clothing, dances, and folklore are showcased in several festivals including the Gjirokastër National Folklore Festival in Gjirokastër; Sofra Dardane every June in Bajram Curri; Oda Dibrane in Peshkopi; Logu I Bjeshkeve every August in Kelmend; Cham Dance Festival in Saranda; and other festivals in various Albanian cities.

See also
Gjirokastër National Folklore Festival

External links

Dances
 
Dances
Albania